Bill Hamel (January 17, 1973 – June 29, 2018) was an American record producer from Orlando, Florida. He was a founding member of American trance group Fatum, and was a two-time Grammy Award nominee.

Bill Hamel was born on January 17, 1973, and died from hepatocellular carcinoma, the most common type of cancer of the liver, on June 29, 2018, shortly after posting a message to his fans about his diagnosis.  He was 45 years old.

Discography
Carmen Electra "I Like It Loud"
Seal "The Best Of Me" On Warner Brothers
Seal "The Weight Of My Mistakes" On Warner Brothers
Kimberly Cole "Smack You" on Crystal Ship
Jason Derülo "In My Head" on Warner Brothers
Tegan & Sara "Aligator" on Reprise Records
Erika Jayne "Pretty Mess" on E1 Music
Jes "Lovesong" on Blackhole Recordings
Michael Bublé "You Got What It Takes" on Reprise Records
Zoot Woman "Live In My Head"
Seth Vogt "Cellophane" on M-Toxin Records
Jason Derülo "Whatcha Say" on Warner Brothers
U2 "Magnificent" on Island
Enrique Iglesias feat Kelis "Not In Love" on Interscope
Seal "Amazing" on Warner Brothers
Paramore "Misery Business" on Atlantic
Tegan & Sarah "Back in Your Head" on Reprise
Mocean Worker "Shake Your Boogie"
Jessie Malay "Booty Bangs" on Warner Brothers
Nelly Furtado "Do It" on Interscope
Marilyn Manson "Heart Shaped Glasses" Interscope
Mandy Moore "Extraordinary" Interscope
Ne-Yo "All Because Of You" on DefJam
Gwen Stefani & Pharrell "Wind It Up" on Interscope Records
Alseep "I Lost You" – Norway
Carina Round "Come To You" on Interscope
Rihanna "Unfaithful" on DefJam
Korn "Coming Undone" on Interscope
Mobile "Montreal Calling" On Interscope
Madonna "Hung Up" On Maverick
Britney Spears "Touch Of My Hand" On Jive
Britney Spears "Piece of Me" On Jive (Unreleased)
Depeche Mode "John the Revelator" on Mute
Rene Asmez "Fragile" on Little Mountain Recordings
Alphaville "Forever Young" on Warner Brothers
Fluke "Nobody" on Sunkissed
New Order "Guilt Is a Useless Emotion" on Warner Brothers
New Order "Krafty" on Warner Brothers
Tonepusher's "Daydreamer" on FADE
Andy Ling "Fixation" Hamel vs. Evolution Remix
Depeche Mode "Enjoy the Silence" on Mute
Esthero "O.G. Bitch" on Warner Brothers
Bluehaze "In To Nothing" on Saw
Brandy feat. Kanye West "Talk About Our Love" on Atlantic
Paul Oakenfold "Hold Your Hand" on Maverick
Toyshop "Million Miles" on Sunkissed
Holly Palmer "Just So You Know" on Warner Brothers
Seal "Get It Together" on Warner Brothers - Grammy nomination for best remix
BT & JC Chasez "Force Of Gravity" on Nettwerk
Brother Brown "Under The Water" on Yoshi Toshi
Prince "When Doves Cry" white
Justin Timberlake "Cry Me A River" - JIVE Records (feat on Paul Oakenfold's Great Wall CD)
Lamb "Gabriel" - Mercury Records
Lamb "Gorecki" - Mercury Records
Jan Johnson "Superstar" - Perfecto (feat on Paul Oakenfold's Ibiza CD)
Delerium "Innocente" – Nettwerk
Powerplant "Angel" (Medway & Hamel Remix)
Jayn Hanna "Lost Without You" – Virgin
Red Shift "Motivation" - Warner's F-111
Inertia "Vellum" - Mute's Future Groove (feat on Dave Seaman's Global Underground-Cape Town CD) 
Mara "One" - Choo Choo Records (feat on Nick Warren's Global Underground-Budapest CD)
Evolution "Phoenix" - Fluid Recordings (feat on Danny Tenaglia's Global Underground-London CD)
Andy Ling "Calling Angels" - Fluid Recordings
Secret Life "She Holds The Key" – DMC

See also
Grammy Award for Best Remixed Recording, Non-Classical

References

External links
  Official website
 Bill Hamel at Soundcloud.com

1973 births
2018 deaths
Musicians from Florida
Record producers from Florida
Musicians from Orlando, Florida